Acharya Shri Vishuddh Sagar Ji Maharaj, born 18 December 1971, in Roor village, Roor, Bhind District, Madhya Pradesh is one of the best-known modern Digambara Jain Acharya (Digambar Jain monks). At the age of sixteen, Acharya Vishuddh Sagar Ji  Kshullaka Yashodhar Ji on 11 October 1989 in Bhind. He became Muni Vishuddh Sagar on 21 November 1991 at Shreyansgiri (M.P.) He attained the rank of Acharya on 31 March 2007 at Aurangabad (Maharashtra).

His Literature 

 Vastutv Mahakavya.

References

External links
Facebook
Youtube
Instagram

Indian Jain monks
1971 births
Living people